Vectra is a brand of liquid crystal polymer (LCP) manufactured by Ticona (a subsidiary of Celanese).

Physical properties of Vectra were tested in the report "Non-Metallic Transducer Mounting Brackets" by the US Naval Research Laboratory in 1992, and the resulting test data is publicly available from the external link below. 

CAS: 81843-52-9 (Vectra A 910).

External links
 Manufacturer's site, UK
 Manufacturer's site, global
 "Non-Metallic Transducer Mounting Brackets," US Naval Research Laboratory

Liquid crystals